The Raindogs were a band formed in Boston, United States around 1985 after several members had disbanded the rock band The Schemers. They combined Celtic and American music to form their own hybrid of rock and roll.  Based in Boston, the band was made up of Mark Cutler, Emerson Torrey, members of recently disbanded New Orleans band Red Rockers Darren Hill and  Jim Reilly (also of Ireland’s “Stiff Little Fingers"), and Johnny Cunningham, formerly of Silly Wizard. The Rhode Island based Schemers had previously won the Providence Rock Hunt and the Boston Rock Rumble band competitions, and their single, Remember was widely played on Providence, Rhode Island FM radio stations.

The Raindogs toured throughout the United States with Warren Zevon, Don Henley, and Bob Dylan and were noted for their incendiary live performances.

Discography
The group released two albums on Atco Records:

Lost Souls (1990).  Produced by Pete Henderson and the Raindogs.
Border Drive-In Theatre (1991).  Produced by Don Gehman.  The album features spoken word performances by Harry Dean Stanton and Iggy Pop.

Personnel
List of band members:
Johnny Cunningham - fiddle and mandolin
Mark Cutler guitar and vocals
Darren Hill - bass guitar
Jim Reilly - drums
Emerson Torrey (replaced Ty Avolio) - guitar and vocals

Johnny Cunningham died in 2003. Mark Cutler has several solo CDs on independent labels, and performs solo and with his bands The Schemers, Men of Great Courage and Forever Young, (Neil Young tribute project). Darren Hill has a management company called Ten Pin Management and in 2011, he opened an antique/memorabilia store in East Greenwich, Rhode Island where he lives.
 Jim Reilly lives in Belfast, Northern Ireland.  Emerson Torrey owns a recording studio and performs with Mark Cutler.

References

Rock music groups from Massachusetts
Musical groups from Boston
Musical groups established in the 1980s
1980s establishments in Massachusetts
Atco Records artists